The Călmățui is a left tributary of the Danube in Romania. Its source is a few km southwest of Buzău. It flows generally eastwards and flows into the Danube at Gura Călmățui.

References

Rivers of Romania
Rivers of Buzău County
Rivers of Brăila County